Robert "Cool" Smith (born 1907 – death date unknown) was an American baseball catcher in the Negro leagues. He played from 1930 to 1944 with multiple clubs.

References

External links
 and Baseball-Reference Black Baseball stats and Seamheads

Birmingham Black Barons players
Cleveland Cubs players
Nashville Elite Giants players
Chicago American Giants players
Memphis Red Sox players
St. Louis Stars (1939) players
St. Louis–New Orleans Stars players
1907 births
Year of death unknown
Baseball catchers